Bayanuur (Mongolian: rich lake) is a sum (district) of Bulgan Province in northern Mongolia. In 2009, its population was 1,526.

References 

Districts of Bulgan Province